Senator Flippo may refer to:

Ronnie Flippo (born 1937), Alabama State Senate
Scott Flippo (born 1979), Arkansas State Senate